Notts County are the oldest club in the Football League. The 2008–09 season was its 12th year in The Football League.

Season review

Kits and sponsorship

League Two

Results summary

Cups

FA Cup
Notts County took on non-League side Sutton Town where they won. After that they took on another non-league side, Kettering Town where they drew resulting in a replay where they lost 2–1.

League Cup
Notts County started their League Cup campaign against newly promoted Championship side, Doncaster Rovers. Myles Weston scored the only goal to put them through to the second round, where they took on Premier League side Wigan Athletic. There they lost 4–0.

Football League Trophy
Notts County's Football League Trophy campaign only lasted one match. League One outfit Scunthorpe United beat the County 2–1 at Glanford Park.

Squad

Statistics
As of end of season

|}

 *Indicates player left during the season

Disciplinary record

Transfers

Summer transfers in

Loans In

January transfers out

Fixtures and results

League

FA Cup

League Cup

Football League Trophy

Backroom staff

See also
Notts County F.C. seasons

References

Notts County F.C. seasons
Notts County